Culex is a genus of mosquito (family Culicidae).

Culex may also refer to:

Culex (video game character), a boss character in the video game Super Mario RPG
Culex (poem), a poem in the Appendix Vergiliana